The Iron and Steel Trades Confederation (ISTC) was a British trade union for metal-workers and allied groups, being the largest union in these fields. It was formed on 1 January 1917 as a merger of existing steel-workers' unions and it is now part of Community.

History 
In 1917 Minister of Labour, John Hodge passed the Trade Unions' Amalgamation Act, which simplified the process whereby Trade Unions merged, amalgamated or federated. This was in response to both the difficulty of mergers under the previous legislation (requiring two-thirds majorities in favor in all participant unions), as well as a desire to push craft unions into general trade unions to cover entire industries. However, difficulties still remained. When the first three members federated in 1917, they were legally prevented from accepting any new members. The ISTC focused on industrial negotiations, and new members joined its subsidiary, the British Iron, Steel and Kindred Trades Association (BISAKTA); formally, unions which federated after 1917 joined this association.

Trade unions that have amalgamated with or transferred engagements to the ISTC or BISAKTA and year it occurred:

British Steel Smelters, Mill, Iron and Tinplate Workers Union (1917)
Associated Iron and Steel Workers of Great Britain (1917)
National Steel Workers' Associated Engineering and Labour League (1917)
Amalgamated Society of Steel and Iron Workers of Great Britain (1920)
Tin and Sheet Millmen's Association (1921)
Wire Workers Union (1922–24, 1991)
National Union of Blastfurnacemen (1985)
Power Loom Carpet Weavers and Textile Workers Union (2000)
National League of the Blind and Disabled (2000)

The resultant union was named the Iron and Steel Trades Confederation. Members of the Amalgamated Association of Steel and Iron Workers of Great Britain and of the Tin and Sheet Millmens' Association voted against joining the union, but were later reballoted and voted in favour. The Wire Workers Union joined the confederation in 1922 but left in 1924, rejoining in 1991.  Other members left in 1924 to form the Constructional Engineering Union.

From the 1980s, employment in the metalworking trades was in sharp decline, and membership of the ISTC dropped in line with this. In 1984, the existing ISTC was legally absorbed by BISAKTA, which took on the ISTC name.

In later years the union also built up representation amongst workers in the electronics industry, plastics and glass, the manufacture of kitchen furniture, carpet production, and call centres. Expansion was especially strong in areas with major steel industry installations.

Responding to the contraction of the British manufacturing sector, the ISTC expanded into new areas in 2000. Both the NLBD and PLCWTWU pre-dating the ISTC having been formed as a trade union in 1899 and 1866 respectively.

In 2004, the ISTC merged with the National Union of Knitwear, Footwear & Apparel Trades (KFAT) to form a new organisation called Community.

Election results
The union sponsored Labour Party candidates in each Parliamentary election.

General Secretaries
1917: Arthur Pugh
1936: John Brown
1946: Lincoln Evans
1953: Harry Douglass
1967: Dai Davies
1975: Bill Sirs
1985: Roy Evans
1993: Keith Brookman
1999: Michael J. Leahy

Assistant General Secretaries
1935: John Brown
1936: Lincoln Evans
1945: Harry Douglass
1953: Dai Davies
1967: Jim Diamond
1973: Bill Sirs
1975: Roy Evans
1985: Keith Brookman
1993: Michael J. Leahy
1999: Eddie Lynch
2004: Roy Rickhuss

References

External links
Catalogue of the ISTC archives, held at the Modern Records Centre, University of Warwick

 
Defunct trade unions of the United Kingdom
1917 establishments in the United Kingdom
Steel industry trade unions of the United Kingdom
Trade unions established in 1917
Trade unions disestablished in 2004
Trade unions based in London